A nomocanon (from the Greek  'law' and  'a rule') is a collection of ecclesiastical law, consisting of the elements from both the civil law and the canon law. Nomocanons form part of the canon law of the Eastern Catholic Churches (through the Eastern Catholic canon law) and of the Eastern Orthodox Church.

Byzantine nomocanons

Nomocanon of John Scholasticus 
The first nomocanon, in the sixth century, is ascribed, though without certainty, to John Scholasticus, whose canons it utilizes and completes. He had drawn up (about 550) a purely canonical compilation in 50 titles, and later composed an extract from the Justinian's Novellae in 87 chapters that relate the ecclesiastical matters. To each of the 50 titles was added the texts of the imperial laws on the same subject, with 21 additional chapters, nearly all borrowed from John's 87 chapters. Thus the Nomocanon of John Scholasticus was made.

Nomocanon in 14 titles 
The second nomocanon dates from the reign of the Byzantine Emperor Heraclius (610–641), at which time Latin was replaced by Greek as the official language of the imperial laws. It was made through the fusion of the Collectio tripartita (collection of Justinian's imperial law) and Canonic syntagma (ecclesiastical canons). Afterwards, this collection would be known as Nomocanon in 14 titles.

Nomocanon of Photios 
The Nomocanon in 14 titles nomocanon was long held in esteem and passed into the Russian Church, but it was by degrees supplanted by the Nomocanon of Photios in 883. 

It contained the Nomocanon in 14 titles, with the addition of 102 canons of Trullan Council, 17 canons of the Council of Constantinople of 861, and three canons substituted by Photios for those of the Council of Constantinople of 869. The Nomocanon in 14 titles was completed with the more recent imperial laws.

This whole collection was commentated about 1170 by Theodore Balsamon, Greek Patriarch of Antioch residing at Constantinople. The Nomocanon of Photios supplemented the Pedalion ( 'rudder'), a sort of Corpus Juris of the Eastern Orthodox Church, printed in 1800 by Patriarch Neophytos VII.

The Nomocanon of Photios retained in the law of the Eastern Orthodox Church and it was included in the Syntagma, published by Rallis and Potlis (Athens, 1852–1859).

St. Sava's Nomocanon

The Nomocanon of Saint Sava, or in Serbian , was the first Serbian constitution and the highest code in the Serbian Orthodox Church; it was finished in 1219. This legal act was well developed. St. Sava's Nomocanon was the compilation of civil law, based on Roman law and canon law, based on ecumenical councils. Its basic purpose was to organize functioning of the young Serbian kingdom and the Serbian church.

During the Nemanjić dynasty (1166–1371) Serbian medieval state was flourishing in the spheres of politics, religion and culture. As the state developed, also the industry developed, so the law had to regulate various number of relations. Therefore, with the development of economy, Roman law was taken. In that time Serbia was not a tsarish empire, so its ruler could not create code of laws, which would regulate the relations in the state and church. Serbian rulers reigned with single legal acts and decrees. In order to overcome this problem and organize legal system, after acquiring religious independence, Saint Sava finished his  in 1219.

The  was accepted in Bulgaria, Romania and Russia. It was printed in Moscow in the 17th century. In Serbia, it was considered as the code of the divine law and it was implemented into Dušan's Code.

During the Serbian Revolution, in 1804 the priest Mateja Nenadović established the Nomocanon of Saint Sava as the code of the liberated Serbia. It was also implemented in Serbian civil code in 1844. The  is still used in the Serbian Orthodox Church as the highest church code.

East Syriac tradition
Nomocanons of the Church of the East by author are:
Ishoʿbokht (8th century), author of the Composition on the Laws (Persian)
Gabriel of Basra (late 9th century), author of the Collection of Judgements (Syriac)
Eliya ibn ʿUbaid (early 10th century), author of the Nomocanon Arabicus (Arabic)
Ibn al-Ṭayyib (11th century), author of the Law of Christianity (Arabic)
ʿAbdishoʿ bar Brikha (d. 1318), author of the Nomokanon (Syriac)

See also
Kormchaia

References

Sources
The entry of the Slavs into Christendom
The Late Medieval Balkans: A Critical Survey from the Late Twelfth Century

Canon law of the Eastern Orthodox Church
Catholic Church legal terminology
Canon law of the Catholic Church

sr:Законоправило